The Stavnsbånd was a serfdom-like institution introduced in Denmark in 1733 in accordance with the wishes of estate owners and the military. It bonded men between the ages of 14 and 36 to live on the estate where they were born. It was possible, however, to purchase a pass releasing one from this bondage. So, in practice, estate owners and their sons were not particularly bonded to live on their estates.

The Stavnsbånd was introduced because of a crisis in 1730 where a lot of peasants tried their luck in the cities. That meant that there was a need for workers on the farms, and for people to join the army.

Background
The institution was introduced to alleviate a serious agricultural crisis in the 1730s. Demand from Denmark's traditional export countries was falling, and people were migrating to the cities, which meant that it was difficult to man the estates. Furthermore, the military needed men for the militia. Military service at the time was in practice delegated to men who were less able in agriculture because it was the estate owner's duty to delegate men to the militia. The age limit was changed three times; in 1735 to 14–36 years, in 1742 to 9–40 years, and in 1764 to 4–40 years.

The institution only applied in Denmark proper, not in the rest of Denmark-Norway. Norway had its own system of serfdom, while a somewhat similar institution, the vistarband, existed in Iceland (also part of the Danish-Norwegian realm) from 1490 to 1894. Slavery was the backbone of the Danish West Indies until 1848.

Abolition
The stavnsbånd was gradually abolished as part of agricultural reforms starting on 20 June 1788. At first, the reform affected only those under the age of 14. Thereafter, it affected those who were over the age of 36, and then those who had served in the military. The main points of the reform were that the bondage to the estates was changed to the administrative districts. The autocracy in Denmark was so well-developed at this time that the Danish state had become less dependent on estate owners as local administrators. By 1848, the introduction of military conscription meant the final transformation of the stavnsbånd, since men could now legally reside in any district they wanted.

See also
 Vornedskab, the preceding serfdom in Denmark.
 Liberty Memorial, Copenhagen, the monument in Copenhagen commemorating the end of Stavnsbånd.

Notes

Serfdom
Social history of Denmark
Labor in Denmark
1733 in Denmark
1788 in Denmark